III: In the Eyes of Fire is the third studio album by American metalcore band Unearth, released on August 8, 2006. The album entered the Billboard album charts at number 35, selling approximately 22,000 copies.  The album had sold in excess of 105,000 copies in the US.

The album was produced by Terry Date, and was their second major release through Metal Blade Records. A special limited edition version of the album was released (in a digipak), containing a DVD showcasing their performance at the 2005 Sounds of the Underground tour, as well as a look at the making of the album.

Track listing

Personnel 

Production and performance credits are adapted from the album liner notes.

Unearth
The whole band is credited for: co-production, art direction
 Trevor Phipps – lead vocals
 Buz McGrath – guitar
 Ken Susi – guitar, backing vocals
 John "Slo" Maggard – bass, backing vocals
 Mike Justian – drums

Production
 Terry Date – production, recording, mixing
 Sam Hofstedt – additional engineering
 Scott Olson – additional engineering
 Ted Jensen – mastering
 Jessie Smith – drum tech
 Jerad Knudson – photography

Reception
The album was met with positive reviews upon its release.

Charts

Trivia 

 Some copies of the regular version include a bonus disc containing hits from some of Metal Blade Records' most known bands.
 Limited Edition copies include a bonus disc with two live tracks recorded in Sayreville, New Jersey
 The front cover contains the Latin words "in oculis ignis", which roughly translates to "in the eyes of fire".
 Giles was based on Giles Corey.
 "Big Bear and the Hour of Chaos", according to Phipps, was recorded in one full hour while the band was drinking a brand of malt liquor called "Big Bear".
 "March of the Mutes" references the Great Fire of Rome.

References

External links 
 
  III: In The Eyes of Fire at Metal Blade

2006 albums
Albums produced by Terry Date
Metal Blade Records albums
Unearth albums